Heshmatiyeh may refer to:
 Heshmatiyeh, Fars
 Heshmatiyeh, Markazi
 Heshmatiyeh, Zeberkhan, Nishapur County, Razavi Khorasan Province
 Heshmatiyeh Prison